"All of the People" is a song by American synthpop band Panama Wedding. It was released on July 23, 2013 as the band's debut single and was later included on their debut extended play, Parallel Play.

Composition
"All of the People" is written in the key of F major. The song has a tempo of 90 beats per minute.

Music video
On April 1, 2014, a lyric video for "All of the People" was uploaded to YouTube by the band's official Vevo account.

Charts

References

2013 debut singles
2013 songs
Songs written by Eric Sanicola